Euglyphia is a group of imbricate protists in the phylum Cercozoa. They are unicellular eukaryotes characterized by a cell body covered in large imbricate scales, and an apical aperture through which they extend either filose pseudopodia or two cilia of different sizes that are not used for gliding.

Classification
Euglyphia is composed of 2 orders and 7 families, with a total of 14 different genera.
Order Euglyphida 
Family Euglyphidae  – Euglypha
Family Trinematidae  – Corythion, Trinema
Family Sphenoderiidae  – Sphenoderia, Trachelocorythion
Family Assulinidae  – Assulina, Placocista
Family Cyphoderiidae  – Cyphoderia, Corothionella, Pseudocorythion
Family Paulinellidae  – Paulinella, Ovulinata, Micropyxidiella
Order Zoelucasida 
Family Zoelucasidae  – Zoelucasa

References

Cercozoa superorders
Taxa described in 2018